Damian Schulz (born 26 February 1990) is a Polish professional volleyball player. A former member of the Poland national team, with which he won the 2018 World Championship. At the professional club level, he plays for Cerrad Enea Czarni Radom.

Career

National team
He was called up to the Polish national team in 2015.

On 30 September 2018, Poland, including Schulz, achieved its 3rd title of the World Champion. Poland beat Brazil in the final (3–0) and defended the title from 2014.

Honours

Clubs
 National championships
 2014/2015  Polish Cup, with Trefl Gdańsk
 2015/2016  Polish SuperCup, with Trefl Gdańsk
 2017/2018  Polish Cup, with Trefl Gdańsk

Individual awards
 2018: Polish Cup – Most Valuable Player

State awards
 2018:  Gold Cross of Merit

References

External links

 
 Player profile at PlusLiga.pl 
 Player profile at Volleybox.net

1990 births
Living people
People from Lębork
Sportspeople from Pomeranian Voivodeship
Polish men's volleyball players
Trefl Gdańsk players
Resovia (volleyball) players
AZS Olsztyn players
Skra Bełchatów players
Czarni Radom players
Opposite hitters